The 1979 Tendring District Council election took place on 3 May 1979 to elect members of Tendring District Council in England. This was the same day as the 1979 general election and other local elections held across the United Kingdom.

Summary

Election result

|}

References

Tendring District Council elections
1979 English local elections
1970s in Essex